Salmydessus or Salmydessos, also Halmydessus or Halmydessos (Ἁλμυδισσός), was a coast-town of ancient Thrace, on the Euxine, about  northwest of the entrance of the Bosporus. The eastern offshoots of the Haemus here come very close to the shore, which they divide from the valley of the Hebrus. The people of Salmydessus were thus cut off from communication with the less barbarous portions of Thrace, and became notorious for their savage and inhuman character, which harmonised well with that of their country, the coast of which was extremely dangerous. Aeschylus, who incorrectly places the town in Asia Minor, describes Salmydessus as "the rugged jaw of the sea, hostile to sailors, step-mother of ships;" and Xenophon informs us, that in his time its people carried on the business of wreckers in a very systematic manner, the coast being marked out into portions by means of posts erected along it, and those to whom each portion was assigned having the exclusive right to plunder all vessels and persons cast upon it. This plan, he says, was adopted to prevent the bloodshed which had frequently been occasioned among themselves by their previous practice of indiscriminate plunder. Strabo describes this portion of the coast of the Euxine as "desert, rocky, destitute of harbours, and completely exposed to the north winds;" while Xenophon characterises the sea adjoining it as "full of shoals." The earlier writers appear to speak of Salmydessus as a district only, but in later authors, as Apollodorus, Pliny the Elder, and Pomponius Mela, it is mentioned as a town.

Little is known respecting the history of this place. Herodotus states that its inhabitants, with some neighbouring Thracian tribes, submitted without resistance to Darius I when he was marching through their country towards the Danube. When the remnant of the Greeks who had followed Cyrus the Younger entered the service of Seuthes, one of the expeditions in which they were employed under Xenophon was to reduce the people of Salmydessus to obedience; a task which they seem to have accomplished without much difficulty.

Its site is located near Midye in European Turkey.

References

Populated places in ancient Thrace
Former populated places in Turkey
History of Kırklareli Province